Thymus piperella is a species of flowering plant in the family Lamiaceae, native to southeast Spain. It is used as a culinary herb, as a flavor in a digestif called 'herbero', and to soften and flavor preserved olives.

References

piperella
Herbs
Endemic flora of Spain
Plants described in 1767
Taxa named by Carl Linnaeus